The Light We Carry: Overcoming in Uncertain Times is a nonfiction book written by Michelle Obama and published on November 15, 2022, by Crown Publishing. According to the Associated Press, the author "shares the contents of her 'personal toolbox' - the habits and practices, attitudes and beliefs, and even physical objects that she uses to overcome her feelings of fear, helplessness and self-doubt." The Light We Carry: Overcoming in Uncertain Times has generally received positive reviews from book critics. In February 2023, it was announced that a podcast series by Obama based on topics in the book called Michelle Obama: The Light Podcast would be released on March 7 by Audible.

Background
In 2018, Obama released her memoir Becoming which sold more than 14 million copies worldwide.

Synopsis
The Light We Carry deals with uncertainty in the world such as the COVID-19 pandemic.

Obama describes times where she felt uncertain or out of place such as being a rare African American undergraduate at Princeton in the 1980s or becoming the first African American First Lady of the United States.

References

External links

Author's website. The Light We Carry. 
Book excerpt. 
 Video. YouTube.
. Video

2022 non-fiction books
American books
Self-help books
American self-help writers
Books by Michelle Obama